Francis Russell Palmer (18 June 1925 – 15 May 1970) was an Australian rules footballer who played with South Melbourne in the Victorian Football League (VFL).

Notes

External links 

1925 births
1970 deaths
Australian rules footballers from Melbourne
Sydney Swans players
People from Port Melbourne